Holbrookia subcaudalis, commonly known as the southern spot-tailed earless lizard, is a species of lizard in the genus Holbrookia. It was previously considered a subspecies of Holbrookia lacerata.

Geographic range
It is found in northern Mexico and the United States in southern Texas.

Description
The southern spot-tailed earless lizard is overall light grayish tan in color, with two paravertebral rows of transverse light-edged dark blotches, one row down either side of the back and a second lateral row of dark, pale-edged blotches that are usually not connected to the paravertebral blotches. They have round, dark spots on the ventral surface of the tail, a characteristic which gives them both their common and scientific names. As with all species and subspecies of earless lizard, they have no external ear openings. When gravid, females will often turn greenish yellow on neck and trunk.

Behavior
As with all earless lizards, the southern spot-tailed earless lizard is diurnal and insectivorous.

Habitat
Their preferred habitat is subhumid agricultural and nonagricultural flatlands and very low rolling hills with sparse vegetation such as small patches of grass on dark clay loam soils, with a few mesquite trees mesquite, but not prickly pear cactus.

Reproduction
They are oviparous.

References
 
 Herps of Texas: Holbrookia lacerata

Further reading
 Axtell, R.W. 1956. A Solution to the Long Neglected Holbrookia lacerata Problem, and the Description of Two New Subspecies of Holbrookia. Bull. Chicago Acad. Sci. 10 (11): 163–179. (Holbrookia lacerata subcaudalis, new subspecies.)
 Behler, J.L., and F.W. King. 1979. The Audubon Society Field Guide to North American Reptiles and Amphibians. New York: A.A. Knopf. 743 pp. . (Holbrookia lacerata subcaudalis, pp. 509–510.)
 Conant, R. 1975. A Field Guide to Reptiles and Amphibians of Eastern and Central North America, Second Edition. The Peterson Field Guide Series. Boston: Houghton Mifflin. xviii + 429 pp.  (hardcover),  (paperback). (Holbrookia lacerata subcaudalis, p. 97 + Map 56.)
 Smith, H.M., and E.D. Brodie, Jr. 1982. Reptiles of North America: A Guide to Field Identification. New York: Golden Press. 240 pp. . (Holbrookia lacerata subcaudalis, p. 130.)

Reptiles of Mexico
Reptiles of the United States
Reptiles described in 1956
Holbrookia